Anoncia orites is a moth in the family Cosmopterigidae. It is found in California, United States.

References

Moths described in 1907
Cosmopteriginae
Moths of North America